The Osse Stream or Osse Ditch, otherwise known as the Appleton Brook, is a small stream in the Vale of White Horse in historic Berkshire, since 1974 in Oxfordshire.

The stream is a tributary of the River Ock, with its confluence near Marcham Mill. The stream rises at a pond in Cumnor, flowing past Besselsleigh, Appleton, Fyfield, Frilford and Marcham.

Name 
The hydronym Osse appears to be derived from the Old English word Wase, meaning 'mud'.

See also
Tributaries of the River Ock
List of rivers of England

References 

Vale of White Horse
Rivers of Oxfordshire
Thames drainage basin